Hamza Lahmar (born 28 May 1990) is a Tunisian international footballer who plays for Al-Wehdat as a midfielder.

Club career
Lahmar has played for Étoile du Sahel, ES Zarzis, ES Hammam-Sousse and Al-Kuwait. In February 2022 he signed for Al-Wehdat.

International career
He made his international debut in 2015, and was named in the squad for the 2017 Africa Cup of Nations.

International goals
Scores and results list Tunisia's goal tally first.

Honours

Club
Étoile Sportive du Sahel
Tunisian Ligue Professionnelle 1 – 2015–16
Tunisian Cup – 2012, 2013–14, 2014–15

International
Tunisia
CAF Confederation Cup – 2015

References

1990 births
Living people
Tunisian footballers
Tunisia international footballers
Étoile Sportive du Sahel players
ES Zarzis players
ES Hammam-Sousse players
Kuwait SC players
Tunisian Ligue Professionnelle 1 players
Kuwait Premier League players
Association football midfielders
2017 Africa Cup of Nations players
Tunisian expatriate footballers
Tunisian expatriate sportspeople in Kuwait
Expatriate footballers in Kuwait
Al-Wehdat SC players
Tunisian expatriates in Jordan
Expatriate footballers in Jordan